Aidomo Emakhu (born 26 October 2003) is an Irish professional footballer who plays for English club Millwall, as a forward.

Early life
Emakhu is from Bawnogue in Clondalkin.

Club career

Early career
Emakhu began his career with St Francis at the age of 6, staying there until 10, before two seasons with Lourdes Celtic and time with Crumlin United. Emakhu then played for Shamrock Rovers, being released at under-15 level; he then returned to Crumlin United and also played for Shelbourne, before returning to Shamrock Rovers.

Shamrock Rovers
On 15 May 2021, he made his senior debut for Shamrock Rovers, coming on as a substitute for Rory Gaffney at the 88th minute of a 1–1 league draw against Derry City. On 5 August 2022, he made his debut in a European competition, coming on the pitch in the final minutes of the UEFA Europa Conference League qualifying match against Teuta Durrës and scoring the game's only goal after a few minutes.

Millwall
In December 2022 it was announced that he would join English club Millwall in January 2023. He was initially assigned to the club's under-23 team, but trained with the first team. He made his debut for the club on 21 February 2023 in a 1–1 draw with league leaders Burnley at The Den.

International career
Born in Ireland, Emakhu is of Nigerian descent. He has played for the Republic of Ireland at under-19 youth level, scoring on his debut in October 2021.

Personal life
Emakhu attended the Moyle Park College in Clondalkin, South Dublin.

Career statistics

References

External links 
 

2003 births
Living people
People from Clondalkin
Sportspeople from South Dublin (county)
Republic of Ireland association footballers
Republic of Ireland youth international footballers
Irish people of Nigerian descent
St Francis F.C. players
Crumlin United F.C. players
Shamrock Rovers F.C. players
Shelbourne F.C. players
Millwall F.C. players
League of Ireland players
Association football forwards
Irish expatriate association footballers
Irish expatriates in England
Expatriate footballers in England
English Football League players